The Kécarpoui River is a salmon river in the Côte-Nord region of Quebec, Canada. It flows south and empties into the Gulf of Saint Lawrence.

Location

The mouth of the river is in the municipality of Gros-Mécatina in Le Golfe-du-Saint-Laurent Regional County Municipality.
The Kécarpoui Archipelago is a group of islands in the Gulf opposite the river mouth.
Kécarpoui is an Innu language word meaning "porcupine river".

Description

The Dictionnaire des rivières et lacs de la province de Québec (1914) says of the river,

Basin

It lies between the basins of the Véco River to the west and the Saint-Augustin River to the east.
It is partly in the unorganized territory of Petit-Mécatina and partly in the municipalities of Gros-Mécatina and Saint-Augustin.
The Lac-Robertson Generating Station, which is powered by a dam on the Véco River, is in the Kécarpoui basin.

Environment

A map of the ecological regions of Quebec shows the Kécarpoui River in sub-regions 6o-T, 6n-T and 6m-T of the east spruce/moss subdomain.
Vegetation in the basin is dominated by conifers.
Mammals include black bear, moose, boreal woodland caribou, wolf, fox, lynx, muskrat, mink, otter and porcupine.
There are seabird colonies on the many islands and islets near the river mouth.

Fishing

The Kécarpoui River is recognized as an Atlantic salmon river.
The river bed is composed of medium-sized rocks.
They average  in weight.
In 2013–2017 an average of 7 salmon were reported caught each year.
The Pourvoirie Kecarpoui/Kecarpoui Outpost provides outfitting services.
They do not have an exclusive right.
They offer 6-day guided fishing expeditions that visit the Véco, Kecarpoui, Saint-Augustin, Coxipi, Chécatica, Napetipi rivers and the Baie des roches.

Notes

Sources

Rivers of Côte-Nord